Ailana Margaret Fraser is a Canadian mathematician and professor of mathematics at the University of British Columbia. She is known for her work in geometric analysis and the theory of minimal surfaces. Her research is particularly focused on extremal eigenvalue  problems and sharp eigenvalue estimates for surfaces, min-max minimal surface theory, free boundary minimal surfaces, and positive isotropic curvature.

Early life and education
Fraser was born in Toronto, Ontario. She received her Ph.D. from Stanford University in 1998 under the supervision of Richard Schoen. After postdoctoral studies at the Courant Institute of New York University, she taught at Brown University before moving to UBC.

Major work
Fraser is well-known for her 2011 work with Schoen on the first "Steklov eigenvalue" of a compact Riemannian manifold-with-boundary. This is defined as the minimal nonzero eigenvalue of the "Dirichlet to Neumann" operator which sends a function on the boundary to the normal derivative of its harmonic extension into the interior. In the two-dimensional case, Fraser and Schoen were able to adapt Paul Yang and Shing-Tung Yau's use of the Hersch trick in order to approximate the product of the first Steklov eigenvalue with the length of the boundary from above, by topological data.

Under an ansatz of rotational symmetry, Fraser and Schoen carefully analyzed the case of an annulus, showing that the metric optimizing the above eigenvalue-length product is obtained as the intrinsic geometry of a geometrically meaningful part of the catenoid. By use of the uniformization theorem for surfaces with boundary, they were able to remove the condition of rotational symmetry, replacing it by certain weaker conditions; however, they conjectured that their result should be unconditional.

In general dimensions, Fraser and Schoen developed a "boundary" version of Peter Li and Yau's "conformal volume." By building upon some of Li and Yau's arguments, they gave lower bounds for the first Steklov eigenvalue in terms of conformal volumes, in addition to isoperimetric inequalities for certain minimal surfaces of the unit ball.

Awards and honors
Fraser won the Krieger–Nelson Prize of the Canadian Mathematical Society in 2012 and became a fellow of the American Mathematical Society in 2013.
In 2018 the Canadian Mathematical Society listed her in their inaugural class of fellows
and in 2021 awarded her, along with Marco Gualtieri, the Cathleen Synge Morawetz Prize. In 2022 she was awarded a Simons Fellowship.

Major publications

References

Year of birth missing (living people)
Living people
Canadian mathematicians
Canadian women mathematicians
Women mathematicians
Stanford University alumni
Brown University faculty
Academic staff of the University of British Columbia
Fellows of the American Mathematical Society
Fellows of the Canadian Mathematical Society
Scientists from Toronto
Courant Institute of Mathematical Sciences alumni